The 2017–18 season is Petrolul Ploiești's 88th season in the Romanian football league system. Petrolul came first in the 2016–17 Liga IV. 
During early 2017, it was reported that the Romanian subsidiary of French company Veolia would take over the club. On 16 June 2017, with financial support from the company, ACS Petrolul 52 Ploiești leased FC Petrolul brand from the Municipality of Ploiești for €30,000 and returned to the former name of FC Petrolul Ploiești, targeting a return to the first division in the 2019–20 season.

Players

First team squad

Current technical staff

Pre-season and friendlies

Competitions

Overview

Liga III

League table

Result round by round

Results

Cupa Romaniei

See also

2017–18 Cupa României
Liga III

Notes and references

FC Petrolul Ploiești seasons
Petrolul Ploiești